The ACBS English Billiards Asian Championships is an English Billiards tournament first held in 1986, and then from 2002. The event is hosted by the Asian Confederation of Billiards Sports (ACBS).

Tournaments

References

Competitions in English billiards
Asian championships